The Poșaga is a small river in the Apuseni Mountains, Alba County, western Romania. It is a left tributary of the river Arieș. It flows through the municipality Poșaga, and joins the Arieș near the village Poșaga de Jos. It is fed by several smaller streams, including Incești, Săgagea and Belioara.

References

Rivers of Romania
Rivers of Alba County